The 2016 Cook Islands Round Cup is the forty-third recorded season of top flight association football competition in the Cook Islands, with any results between 1951 and 1969 and also in 1986 and 1988–1990 currently unknown. Puaikura won the championship going unbeaten through the entire season to qualify for the 2017 OFC Champions League.

League table

Results

References

Cook Islands Round Cup seasons
Cook
football